Magnisphyricon is the second studio album by the German symphonic metal band Sons of Seasons, released in 2011.

The album title, cover art and track list was revealed through Myspace on January 22, 2011.

Track listing
All lyrics by Oliver Palotai, music as indicated

 "Magnisphyricon: Temperance" (Palotai) – 2:03
 "Bubonic Waltz" (Palotai) – 5:47
 "Soul Symmetry" (Pepe Pierez) – 5:01
 "Sanctuary" (Palotai) – 5:56
 "Casus Belli I: Guilt's Mirror" (Pierez, Henning Basse, Palotai) – 6:01
 "Magnisphyricon: Adjustment" (Palotai) – 0:41
 "Into the Void" (Basse, Palotai) – 5:07
 "A Nightbird's Gospel" (Palotai) – 7:03
 "Tales of Greed" (Palotai) – 4:56
 "Lilith" (Pierez, Basse, Palotai) – 5:30
 "Casus Belli II: Necrologue to the Unborn" (Pierez, Basse, Palotai) – 5:26
 "Magnisphyricon: The Aeon" (Palotai) – 0:23
 "1413" (Pierez, Basse, Palotai) – 6:53
 "Yesteryears" (Palotai) – 5:06

Personnel
Band members
 Henning Basse – lead and backing vocals
 Oliver Palotai – keyboards, guitars, backing vocals
 Pepe Pierez – guitars, backing vocals
 Jürgen Steinmetz – bass
 Daniel Schild – drums, percussion

Additional musicians
 Simone Simons (Epica) – vocals on "Sanctuary", backing vocals
 Guoimar Espiñeira Pandelo - flute
 Torger Neuhaus, Michelle Gierke - choir

Production
Dennis Ward - mixing

References

2011 albums
Napalm Records albums